Akbar Shah is a thana under the Chattogram District in Chattogram Division, Bangladesh.

See also 
 Upazilas of Bangladesh
 Districts of Bangladesh
 Divisions of Bangladesh

References 

Thanas of Chittagong District
Neighborhoods in Chittagong